Ilia Beriashvili (born 9 July 1998) is a Georgian football player. He plays for Hungarian club Mezőkövesd.

Club career
He made his debut in the Russian Football National League for FC Rotor Volgograd on 10 July 2021 in a game against FC Tekstilshchik Ivanovo.

On 13 December 2022, Beriashvili signed with Mezőkövesd in Hungary.

References

External links
 
 Profile by Russian Football National League

1998 births
People from Telavi
Living people
Footballers from Georgia (country)
Georgia (country) under-21 international footballers
Association football defenders
FC Kakheti Telavi players
FC Telavi players
FC Rotor Volgograd players
Mezőkövesdi SE footballers
Erovnuli Liga players
Russian First League players
Nemzeti Bajnokság I players
Expatriate footballers from Georgia (country)
Expatriate footballers in Russia
Expatriate sportspeople from Georgia (country) in Russia
Expatriate footballers in Hungary
Expatriate sportspeople from Georgia (country) in Hungary